Launcelot John Goody  (5 June 1908 – 13 May 1992), an Australian metropolitan bishop, was the sixth Roman Catholic Archbishop of Perth, serving from 1968 to 1983. Prior to his election as Archbishop of Perth, Goody served as the inaugural Bishop of Bunbury from 1954 to 1968.

Early years and background
When Goody was aged eight years, together with his parents he migrated to Australia from England due to his father starting to feel the effects of creeping spinal paralysis. The family arrived in Perth and were met by representatives of Archbishop Patrick Clune, having converted from Anglicanism to Catholicism some years yearlier.

Goody was ordained a priest in Rome by Archbishop Giuseppe Palica on 20 December 1930 in Rome, aged 22.

On 2 August 1951 he was appointed Auxiliary Bishop of Perth, as well as Titular Bishop of Abydus, and was consecrated three months later.

Bishop and Archbishop
On 12 November 1954, aged 46, he was appointed the first Roman Catholic Bishop of Bunbury, in Western Australia. On 18 October 1968, aged 60, he was appointed Archbishop of Perth, Australia. During his time as a prelate, Goody attended all four sessions of the Second Vatican Council.

Retiring on 26 October 1983, Goody was appointed Archbishop Emeritus of Perth; until his death on 13 May 1992, aged 83.

Honours
Goody became a Knight Commander of the Order of the British Empire for service to the Roman Catholic Church as part of the 1977 New Year's Honour List (effective 31 December 1976). He personally received the accolade from Queen Elizabeth II during her Silver Jubilee visit to Australia in 1977. The L J Goody Bioethics Centre, an agency of the Roman Catholic Archdiocese of Perth, was founded in 1985 and named in honour of Goody.

References

Further reading

1908 births
1992 deaths
Australian Knights Commander of the Order of the British Empire
British emigrants to Australia
Participants in the Second Vatican Council
Roman Catholic archbishops of Perth
20th-century Roman Catholic archbishops in Australia
Roman Catholic bishops of Bunbury